A Crazy Night is a 1927 German silent comedy film directed by Richard Oswald and starring Ossi Oswalda, Harry Liedtke and Henry Bender. It was shot at the EFA Studios in Berlin. The film's sets were designed by the art director Heinrich Richter.

Cast
 Ossi Oswalda as Margot Olschinsky, Varieté-Tänzerin
 Harry Liedtke as Odoardo Bonaventura, Der Kanonenkönig
 Henry Bender as Florian Pieper, Insektenpulverfabrikant aus Essig an der Gurke
 Mira Hildebrand as Therese, seine Frau
 Ferdinand Bonn as Ruhesanft, Küster an Essig an der Gurke
 Paul Graetz as Pille, Apotheker in Essig an der Gurke
 Maria Forescu as Frau Lindemann aus Essig an der Gurke
 Hedy Waldow as Nellz, Frau Lindemanns Nichte
 Bobbie Bender as Dr. Grednitz, Syndikus in der Scala
 Hermann Picha as Frau Meier, Hebamme
 Kurt Gerron as Wachtmeister Lehmkuhl
 Paul Westermeier as Lattenfritze
 Kurt Lilien as Palisandenkarf
 Hella Kürty as Adelina, eine Privatiere
 Lola Legro as Zofe der Olschinsky
 Wilhelm Bendow as Ein Schuhkünstler
 Otto Kermbach as Ein Musiker

References

Bibliography
 Bock, Hans-Michael & Bergfelder, Tim. The Concise CineGraph. Encyclopedia of German Cinema. Berghahn Books, 2009.

External links

1927 films
1927 comedy films
German comedy films
Films of the Weimar Republic
German silent feature films
Films directed by Richard Oswald
German black-and-white films
Silent comedy films
1920s German films
Films shot at Halensee Studios